Erie County is a county along the shore of Lake Erie in western New York State. As of the 2020 census, the population was 954,236. The county seat is Buffalo, which makes up about 28% of the county's population. Both the county and Lake Erie were named for the regional Iroquoian language-speaking Erie tribe of Native Americans, who lived in the area before 1654. They were later pushed out by the more powerful Iroquoian nations tribes.

Erie County, along with its northern neighbor Niagara County, makes up the Buffalo-Niagara Falls metropolitan area, the second largest in the State of New York behind New York City. The county's southern part is known as the Southtowns. The county has seen one of the highest growth rates of any county in the State of New York from the 2010 to 2020 census.

History
When counties were established by the English colonial government in the Province of New York in 1683, present-day Erie County was part of Indian territory occupied by Iroquoian-speaking peoples. It was administered as part of New York colony. Significant European-American settlement did not begin until after the United States had gained independence with the end of the American Revolutionary War in 1783. They forced the Iroquois to cede most of their lands, as many had been allies of the British. ["They" ambiguous; reference required]

About 1800, the Holland Land Company, formed by Americans and Dutch associates, extinguished Indian claims by purchasing the land from New York, acquired the title to the territory of what are today the eight westernmost counties of New York, surveyed their holdings, established towns and began selling lots to individuals. The state was eager to attract settlers and have homesteads and businesses developed. At this time, all of western New York was included in Ontario County.

As the population increased, the state legislature created Genesee County in 1802 out of part of Ontario County. In 1808, Niagara County was created out of Genesee County. In 1821, Erie County was created out of Niagara County, encompassing all the land between Tonawanda Creek and Cattaraugus Creek. The first towns formed in present-day Erie County were the Town of Clarence and the Town of Willink. Clarence and Willink comprised the northern and southern portions of Erie county, respectively. Clarence is still a distinct town, but Willink was quickly subdivided into other towns. When Erie County was established in 1821, it consisted of the towns of Amherst, Aurora, Boston, Clarence, Collins, Concord, Eden, Evans, Hamburg, Holland, Sardinia and Wales.

The county has a number of houses and other properties listed on the National Register of Historic Places listings in Erie County, New York.

In 1861, the hamlet of Town Line in the Town of Lancaster voted 85–40 to secede from the Union. Town Line never sought admission into the Confederate States of America and there is no evidence that men from the community ever fought for the Confederacy. Some reporting from that time indicates the vote was a joke. On January 24, 1946, as part of a nationally reported event, Town Line voted to officially return to the Union after 85 years of Union secession.

Geography

Erie County is in the western portion of upstate New York, bordering on the lake of the same name. Part of the industrial area that has included Buffalo, it is the most populous county in upstate New York outside of the New York City metropolitan area. The county also lies on the international border between the United States and Canada, bordering the Province of Ontario.

The northern border of the county is Tonawanda Creek. Part of the southern border is Cattaraugus Creek. Other major streams include Buffalo Creek (Buffalo River), Cayuga Creek, Cazenovia Creek, Scajaquada Creek, Eighteen Mile Creek and Ellicott Creek. The county's northern half, including Buffalo and its suburbs, is known as the Northtowns and is relatively flat and rises gently up from the lake. The southern half, known as the Southtowns, is much hillier. It has the northwesternmost foothills of the Appalachian Mountains. The highest elevation in the county is a hill in the Town of Sardinia that tops out at around 1,940 feet (591 m) above sea level. The lowest ground is about 560 feet (171 m), on Grand Island at the Niagara River. The Onondaga Escarpment runs through the northern part of Erie County.

Rivers, streams and lakes

 Buffalo River
 Cattaraugus Creek
 Cayuga Creek
 Cazenovia Creek
 Eighteen Mile Creek
 Ellicott Creek
 Lake Erie
 Niagara River
 Scajaquada Creek
 Tonawanda Creek

Adjacent counties and municipality
 Niagara County - north
 Genesee County - northeast
 Wyoming County - southeast
 Cattaraugus County - south
 Chautauqua County - southwest
 Niagara Region, Ontario, Canada - northwest

Major highways

   Interstate 90 (New York State Thruway)
  Interstate 190 (Niagara Thruway)
  Interstate 290 (Youngmann Expressway)
  Interstate 990 (Lockport Expressway)
  U.S. Route 20 (Southwestern Boulevard/Transit Road/Broadway)
  U.S. Route 20A (Big Tree Road)
  U.S. Route 62 (South Park Avenue/Bailey Avenue/Niagara Falls Boulevard)
  U.S. Route 219 (Southern Expressway)
  New York State Route 5 (Hamburg Turnpike/Buffalo Skyway/Main Street)
  New York State Route 16 (Seneca Street)
  New York State Route 33 (Kensington Expressway/Genesee Street)
  New York State Route 39
  New York State Route 78 (Transit Road)
  New York State Route 179 (Milestrip Expressway/Road)
  New York State Route 198 (Scajaquada Expressway)
  New York State Route 263 (Grover Cleveland Highway/Millersport Highway)
  New York State Route 240 (Orchard Park Road/Harlem Road)
  New York State Route 277 (Union Road)
  New York State Route 324 (Grand Island Boulevard/Sheridan Drive)
  New York State Route 354 (Clinton Street)
  New York State Route 400 (Aurora Expressway)

Erie County routes

National protected area
 Theodore Roosevelt Inaugural National Historic Site

State protected areas

 Amherst State Park, Town of Amherst.
 Beaver Island State Park, Town of Grand Island.
 Buckhorn Island State Park, Town of Grand Island.
 Buffalo Harbor State Park, City of Buffalo.
 Evangola State Park, Towns of Brant and Evans.
 Great Baehre Swamp Wildlife Management Area, Town of Amherst.
 Hampton Brook Woods Wildlife Management Area, Village of Hamburg.
 Knox Farm State Park, Town of East Aurora.
 Motor Island Wildlife Management Area, Town of Grand Island.
 Onondaga Escarpment Unique Area, Town of Akron.
 Reinstein Woods Nature Preserve, Town of Cheektowaga.
 Spicer Creek Wildlife Management Area, Town of Grand Island.
 Strawberry Island State Park, Town of Townawanda.
 Tillman Road Wildlife Management Area, Town of Clarence.
 Woodlawn Beach State Park, Town of Hamburg.
 Zoar Valley Multiple Use Area, Town of Collins.

Demographics

As of the 2020, there were 954,236 people living in the county. The population density was 915 people per square mile (353/km2). There were 438,747 housing units at an average density of 421 per square mile (162/km2). The racial makeup of the county was 72.6% White, 14.1% Black or African American, 0.6% Native American, 4.9% Asian, 0.03% Pacific Islander, 2.3% from other races and 5.4% from two or more races. 6.3% of the population were Hispanic or Latino of any race. 19.6% were of German, 17.2% Polish, 14.9% Italian, 11.7% Irish and 5.0% English ancestry according to Census 2000. 91.1% spoke English, 3% Spanish and 1.6% Polish as their first language.

 There were 380,873 households, out of which 29.6% had children under the age of 18 living with them, 46.5% were married couples living together, 13.7% had a female householder with no husband present and 36.1% were non-families. 30.5% of all households were made up of individuals, and 12.5% had someone living alone who was 65 years of age or older. The average household size was 2.41 and the average family size was 3.04. In the county, the population was spread out, with 24.3% under 18, 8.7% from 18 to 24, 28.4% from 25 to 44, 22.7% from 45 to 64, and 15.9% older than 65. The median age was 38 years. For every 100 females, there were 91.6 males. For every 100 females age 18 and over, there were 87.8 males.

The median income for a household in the county was $38,567 and the median income for a family was $49,490. Males had a median income of $38,703 versus $26,510 for females. The per capita income for the county was $20,357. About 9.2% of families and 12.2% of the population were below the poverty line, including 17.3% of those under 18 and 7.8% of those older than 65.

2020 Census

County government and politics
Prior to 1936, Erie County predominantly backed Republican Party candidates, with only four Democratic Party candidates winning the county in a presidential election - James Buchanan in 1856, George B. McClellan in 1864, Grover Cleveland in 1892 and Woodrow Wilson in 1912. However, starting with the 1936 election, it has turned predominantly Democratic since then, with only two Republicans carrying the county in a presidential election-- Dwight D. Eisenhower in 1952 and 1956 and Richard Nixon in 1972, with Nixon being the most recent. In 2016, like many other counties in the Rust Belt, Donald Trump drastically expanded the Republican vote share thanks to his appeal to working-class whites and Ethnic-Catholic voters. Four years later, in 2020, Joe Biden won 267,270 votes in Erie County, more than Barack Obama in 2008. Biden's margin of victory, however, was smaller than Obama's 2008 victory within the county. 

 

|}

Erie County executives

Elected officials

County legislature

Education

School districts

School districts include:
 Akron Central School District
 Alden Central School District
 Amherst Central School District
 Attica Central School District
 Buffalo City School District
 Cheektowaga Central School District
 Cheektowaga-Maryvale Union Free School District
 Cheektowaga-Sloan Union Free School District
 Clarence Central School District
 Cleveland Hill Union Free School District
 Depew Union Free School District
 East Aurora Union Free School District
 Eden Central School District
 Evans-Brant Central School District (Lake Shore) a.k.a. Lake Shore Central School District
 Frontier Central School District
 Grand Island Central School District
 Gowanda Central School District
 Hamburg Central School District
 Holland Central School District
 Iroquois Central School District
 Kenmore-Tonawanda Union Free School District
 Lackawanna City School District
 Lancaster Central School District
 North Collins Central School District
 Orchard Park Central School District
 Springville-Griffith Institute Central School District
 Sweet Home Central School District
 Tonawanda City School District
 West Seneca Central School District
 Williamsville Central School District
 Yorkshire-Pioneer Central School District

"Special act" school districts
 Randolph Academy Union Free School District - In 2011 it took the territory of another special act district, Hopevale Union Free School District

As of the 2010 U.S. Census some parts of this county were not in a defined school district, with some undefined land and some undefined water.

Higher education

 Buffalo State College
 Canisius College
 Daemen College
 D'Youville University
 Erie Community College
 Hilbert College
 Medaille College
 Trocaire College
 University at Buffalo
 Villa Maria College
 Bryant & Stratton College

Attractions and recreation
Erie County is home to three professional teams—the NFL's Buffalo Bills, the NHL's Buffalo Sabres and the NLL's Buffalo Bandits, along with Division I's Buffalo Bulls and MILB's Buffalo Bisons. The city of Buffalo also features the Buffalo Zoo, The Buffalo History Museum, Burchfield-Penney Art Center and Albright-Knox Art Gallery (all located within a mile of each other in the Delaware Park System), Buffalo and Erie County Botanical Gardens and Buffalo Museum of Science, in addition to tourist districts such as Canalside and Larkinville. The Erie County Fair, held every August in the Town of Hamburg from 1820 to 2019 (the 2020 event, like much everything else across the country, was cancelled due to the COVID-19 pandemic), is one of the largest county fairs in the United States.

Erie County Department of Parks, Recreation and Forestry
The Erie County Department of Parks, Recreation and Forestry was established in 1925 with four parks spanning . Management objectives include providing and maintaining recreational space and the conservation of the county's natural and historic resources. A 2003 Master Plan identified several broad categories of parks operated by the county, including heritage parks, waterfront parks, conservation parks, special purpose parks and forest management areas.

Heritage parks

Erie County's heritage parks include the five original county parks that were established during the 1920s and 1930s. These parks are examples of multiple-use sites with significant scenic, natural and historic features. Each park has unique man-made structures of historical character, many constructed as part of the Works Progress Administration movement in the 1930s.
 Akron Falls Park (Established in 1933, acquired by Erie County in 1947)
 Chestnut Ridge Park (Established by Erie County in 1926)
 Como Lake Park (Established in 1923, acquired by Erie County in 1926)
 Ellicott Creek Park (Established by Erie County in 1926)
 Emery Park (Established by Erie County in 1925)

Waterfront parks
Waterfront parks include the significant scenic sites and recreational trail systems along the county's Lake Erie shoreline.
 Bennett Beach Park
 Isle View Park
 Riverwalk Park
 Wendt Beach Park

Conservation parks

These largely-undeveloped parks are managed primarily for conservation of the natural environment and passive nature-based outdoor recreation activities. These lands are intended to generally remain in a natural state.
 Boston Forest
 Eighteen Mile Creek Park
 Franklin Gulf Park
 Sgt. Mark A. Rademacher Memorial Park (commonly known as Hunters Creek Park)
 Scoby Dam Park

Special purpose parks
Special purpose parks have unique characteristics that provide specific recreational functions within the county's park system.
 Buffalo and Erie County Botanical Gardens
 Elma Meadows Golf Course
 Grover Cleveland Golf Course
 Sprague Brook Park

Forest management areas
Forest management areas are managed by the Erie County Bureau of Forestry, which was established in 1927. These areas include several thousand acres of mostly-coniferous plantation style forest, much of which was planted on abandoned farmland by the Civilian Conservation Corps in the 1930s. These areas are located mostly in the rural southern portion of the county. These lands have limited recreation potential, mostly in the form of trails. Management of these lands is focused on natural resource conservation, in addition to potential commercial resource extraction of timber products or maple syrup.

Communities

† - County Seat

‡ - Not Wholly in this County

Towns

 Alden
 Amherst
 Aurora
 Boston
 Brant
 Cheektowaga
 Clarence
 Colden
 Collins
 Concord
 Eden
 Elma
 Evans
 Grand Island
 Hamburg
 Holland
 Lancaster
 Marilla
 Newstead
 North Collins
 Orchard Park
 Sardinia
 Tonawanda
 Wales
 West Seneca

Hamlets

 Akron Junction
 Alden Center
 Armor
 Athol Springs
 Bagdad
 Bellevue
 Big Tree
 Blakeley
 Blossom
 Boston
 Bowmansville
 Brant
 Brighton
 Carnegie
 Chaffee
 Clarksburg
 Cleveland Hill
 Clifton Heights
 Collins Center
 Concord
 Creekside
 Crittenden
 Dellwood
 Derby
 Doyle
 Duells Corner
 Dutchtown
 East Amherst
 East Concord
 East Eden
 East Elma
 East Seneca
 Ebenezer
 Eden Valley
 Ellicott
 Elma
 Evans Center
 Ferry Village
 Footes
 Forks
 Fowlerville
 Gardenville
 Getzville
 Glenwood
 Green Acres
 Griffins Mills
 Holland
 Hunts Corners
 Jerusalem Corners
 Jewettville
 Kenilworth
 Lake View
 Langford
 Lawtons
 Locksley Park
 Looneyville
 Loveland
 Marilla
 Marshfield
 Millersport
 Millgrove
 Morton Corners
 Mount Vernon
 Murrays Corner
 New Ebenezer
 New Oregon
 North Bailey
 North Evans
 Oakfield
 Patchin
 Peters Corners
 Pine Hill
 Pinehurst
 Pontiac
 Porterville
 Protection
 Sand Hill
 Sandy Beach
 Scranton
 Sheenwater
 Shirley
 Snyder
 South Cheektowaga
 South Newstead
 South Wales
 Spring Brook
 Swifts Mills
 Taylor Hollow
 Town Line Station
 Swormville
 Walden Cliffs
 Wales Hollow
 Water Valley
 Webster Corners
 Wende
 West Alden
 West Falls
 Weyer
 Williston
 Windom
 Wolcottsburg
 Woodlawn
 Woodside
 Wyandale
 Zoar

Indian reservations
 Cattaraugus Reservation
 Tonawanda Reservation

See also

 Erie County Sheriff's Office
 Erie Township, Illinois
 Erie Township, Minnesota
 List of counties in New York
 National Register of Historic Places listings in Erie County, New York

References

Further reading

External links

 Erie County Bureau of Forestry Trails
 Erie County Government website (county overview here)
 The Buffalo and Erie County Historical Society
 Erie County Fair
 U.S. Census Bureau
 
 The Roman Catholic Diocese of Buffalo, New York
 The Erie County Fiscal Stability Authority website a New York state public-benefit corporation

 
1821 establishments in New York (state)
Populated places established in 1821
Buffalo–Niagara Falls metropolitan area
New York placenames of Native American origin